Republic of Korea Auxiliary Police (Hangul: 대한민국 의무경찰) is an organization belonging to the National Police Agency in South Korea. It is a kind of switched service that attracts and uses active resources to fulfill the military service in Korea. The Auxiliary Police supply personnel on a voluntary basis.

The National Police Agency's auxiliary police force will be trained at the education level of each local government office after completing basic military at the Army Training Center, and will be assigned to the task force, security patrol team, and others. The service period is 21 months like that of the Army. Large numbers of people are also deployed to prevent crime in areas where crimes are chronic. It is used to apply for large scale career requirements among police duties.

The establishment 
Republic of Korea Auxiliary police was founded on December 31, 1982, with the aim of assisting security after the curfew was lifted. In 1967, the combat police were organized, Auxiliary Police separated in 1982.

Recruitment and deployment process 
Auxiliary Police submits application forms and required documents to the police department belonging to the local police office, and takes the selection process at the designated time and place.

It will receive a four-week basic military training at the Army Training Center and three-week training session for the local police agency. It will be deployed to the local police station depending on the results of the Army Training Center and training session for the local police agency, which considers the location and location of the site.

The basic military training for police officers is the same four-week training camp as the Recruit Service, and the deployment criteria are the educational performance at the Army Training Center and the Regional Security Agency.

Rank structure

Organization Structure
Seoul Metropolitan Police Agency

Headquarter Task force
1 Task Force
11 Company
12 Company
13 Company
14 Company
15 Company
16 Company
17 Company
18 Company
19 Company
2 Task Force
21 Company
22 Company
23 Company
24 Company
25 Company
3 Task Force
31 Company
32 Company
33 Company
34 Company
35 Company
36 Company
37 Company
38 Company
4 Task Force
41 Company
42 Company
43 Company
45 Company
46 Company
47 Company
5 Task Force
51 Company
52 Company
53 Company
55 Company
56 Company
57 Company
59 Company
Auxiliary Police Corporation
105 Auxiliary Police Corporation
603 Auxiliary Police Corporation
606 Auxiliary Police Corporation
607 Auxiliary Police Corporation
713 Auxiliary Police Corporation
715 Auxiliary Police Corporation
718 Auxiliary Police Corporation
802 Auxiliary Police Corporation
806 Auxiliary Police Corporation
809 Auxiliary Police Corporation
 Police station
Gang-nam Security Patrol
Gang-dong Security Patrol
Gang-buk Security Patrol
Gang-seo Security Patrol
Gwan-ak Security Patrol
Gwang-jin Security Patrol
Guro Security Patrol
Geum-cheon Security Patrol
Namdaemun Security Patrol
No-won Security Patrol
Do-bong Security Patrol
Dongdaemun Security Patrol
Dong-jak Security Patrol
Mapo Security Patrol
Bang-bae Security Patrol
Seodaemun Security Patrol
Seo-bu Security Patrol
Seo-cho Security Patrol
Seong-dong Security Patrol
Seong-buk Security Patrol
Song-pa Security Patrol
Su-seo Security Patrol
Yang-cheon Security Patrol
Yeongdeungpo Security Patrol
Yong-san Security Patrol
Eun-pyeong Security Patrol
Jong-ro Security Patrol
Jong-am Security Patrol
Joong-rang Security Patrol
Joong-bu Security Patrol
Hye-hwa Security Patrol

Busan Metropolitan Police Agency

 Mobile Police Force
Headquarter Mobile Police Force
1 Company
2 Company
 Police station
Buk-bu Security Patrol
Dong-nae Security Patrol
Sa-ha Security Patrol
Dong-bu Security Patrol
Busanjin Security Patrol
Geum-Jung Security Patrol
Nambu Security Patrol
Haeundae Security Patrol
Sa-sang Security Patrol

Daegu Metropolitan Police Agency

 Mobile Police Force
1 Company
 Police station
Joongbu Security Patrol
Dal-seo Security Patrol
Seobu Security Patrol
Nambu Security Patrol
Bukbu Security Patrol
Su-seong Security Patrol

Incheon Metropolitan Police Agency

 Mobile Police Force
3 Company
6 Company
Airport Mobile Police Force
 Police station
Joongbu Security Patrol
Nambu Security Patrol
Nam-dong Security Patrol
Gye-yang Security Patrol
Seobu Security Patrol

Gwangju Metropolitan Police Agency

 Mobile Police Force
8 Company
 Police station
Dongbu Security Patrol
Seobu Security Patrol
Nambu Security Patrol
Bukbu Security Patrol

Daejeon Metropolitan Police Agency

 Mobile Police Force
National Security Agency in Daejeon
 Police station
Seobu Security Patrol
Dae-duk Security Patrol
Dun-san Security Patrol

Ulsan Metropolitan Police Agency

 Mobile Police Force
 1 Company
2 Company
3 Company

Gyeonggi Nambu Provincial Police Agency

 Mobile Police Force
1 Company
2 Company
3 Company
4 Company
5 Company
 Auxiliary Police Corporation
120 Auxiliary Police Corporation
126 Auxiliary Police Corporation
705 Auxiliary Police Corporation
807 Auxiliary Police Corporation
 Police station
Suwon Joongbu Security Patrol
Yong-in Dongbu Security Patrol
Anyang Dong-ahn Security Patrol
Gwacheon Security Patrol
Seong-nam Soo-jeong Security Patrol
Hwa-seong Dongbu Security Patrol
Pyeong-taek Security Patrol
Gwang-myeong Security Patrol

Gyeonggi Bukbu Provincial Police Agency

 Mobile Police Force
1 Company
2 Company
3 Company
5 Company
 Police station
Uijeongbu Security Patrol
Il-san Dongbu Security Patrol

Gangwon Provincial Police Agency

 Mobile Police Force
1 Company
2 Company
 Police station
Gangneung Security Patrol

Chungbuk Provincial Police Agency

 Mobile Police Force
1 Company
 Auxiliary Police Corporation
 Police station
Cheong-ju Sangdang Security Patrol
Cheong-ju Heung-duk Security Patrol

Chungnam Provincial Police Agency

 Mobile Police Force
1 Company
2 Company
 Auxiliary Police Corporation
505 Auxiliary Police Corporation
708 Auxiliary Police Corporation
 Police station

Jeonbuk Provincial Police Agency

 Mobile Police Force
1 Company
2 Company
 Auxiliary Police Corporation
308 Auxiliary Police Corporation
 Police station
Jeon-ju Wan-san Security Patrol
Jeon-ju Deok-jin Security Patrol

Jeonnam Provincial Police Agency

 Mobile Police Force
11 Company
 Auxiliary Police Corporation
501 Auxiliary Police Corporation
507 Auxiliary Police Corporation
716 Auxiliary Police Corporation
 Police station
Mok-po Security Patrol

Gyeongbuk Provincial Police Agency

 Mobile Police Force
1 Company
2 Company
 Auxiliary Police Corporation
315 Auxiliary Police Corporation
Dokdo Security Police
 Police station
Gyeong-ju Security Patrol
Po-nam Security Patrol
Gumi Security Patrol

Gyeongnam Provincial Police Agency

 Mobile Police Force
1 Company
2 Company
3 Company
5 Company
6 Company
 Auxiliary Police Corporation
502 Auxiliary Police Corporation
509 Auxiliary Police Corporation
 Police station
Chang-won Jungbu Security Patrol
Masan Jungbu Security Patrol

Jeju Provincial Police Agency

 Defense Corporation
Jeju Coastal Line Defense Corps
901 Auxiliary police battalion
902 Auxiliary police battalion
121 Auxiliary Police Corporation
123 Auxiliary Police Corporation
127 Auxiliary Police Corporation
128 Auxiliary Police Corporation
Airport Mobile Police Force
 Police station
Jeju Dongbu Security Patrol

The organizational system can be divided into those directly under police agencies and those belonging to the Task Force.

Members of the mobile units will be classified as local police and police officers. The internal structure of the task force consists of the headquarters platoon, the 1st Platoon, the 2nd Platoon and the 3rd Platoon.

The leader of the start-up team is the Director General, the Assistant Director is the Director General, the Director of the start-up team is the Director General, the Manerintendent is the Head, and the Director of the Company is the Director. In normal cases, an Inspector will take over the platoon leader for riot police belonging to the local police department or for security patrols. However, some are in charge of acting as a platoon leader, with the Assistant Inspector-class wearing green shoes. In addition, the assistant platoon leader is usually the Assistant Inspector level, but Senior Policeman is in some cases.

Identity 
Identity is a police officer and not a soldier during service as Auxiliary Police. Also, they belong to the police officers, which are prescribed under Article 2 (1) of the National Compensation Act.

Peacetime and wartime operation 
Based on the permanent establishment company, the agency will be operated in peacetime under the direction of management of the experience, which is provided by the police service department of each district. Career management is divided into preparation for the situation, congestion security, facility security, security patrols, and transportation assistance.

Congestion guards play a role of maintaining order and protecting key personnel at various event sites, and facility security refers to guarding important facilities.

A security patrol is generally defined as a patrol unit patrolling the jurisdiction of the police station to which the unit belongs.

Auxiliary Police will also fight with the military's reserve in case of emergency. It has a K2 rifle, an individual weapon, and basic personal equipment such as magazines and helmets. Unlike the South Korean military, however, they do not fire rifles in peacetime, and only one or two times a year they conduct regular shooting exercises at nearby military firing ranges.

The Auxiliary police in culture 
Auxiliary police also appear in dramas and movies when demonstration scene.

In the comics, Naver Webtoon author Jo Seok frequently describes his experiences in Auxiliary police service by writing a comic book titled "The Sound of Heart" (Hangul: 마음의 소리). It was published in June 2007.

On Naver Webtoons, Seongjeon and Yoon Sung-won are running a cartoon entitled "Beautiful Gunbari" every Monday. The writer describes the situation in the mid-2000s when he was serving in the military in a very realistic manner. On the other hand, the difference between the existing comics is that the main characters and the order of the group are both women as in the comic universe South Korea has enacted a universal conscription policy which both men and women are required to perform compulsory military service.

The Dissolution of The Auxiliary Police 
Moon Jae-in, the president, announced plans to completely lift the Republic of Korea Auxiliary Police after 2023.

As a result, National Police Agency has been cutting staff by 20 percent every year since 2017.

After the last conscripted conscripts in December 2021, they will be completely abolished after September 2023.

Relevant laws 

 Police law
 Act on the establishment and operation of the Auxiliary police force
 The Military Service Law

References

External links 

Law enforcement in South Korea
1967 establishments in South Korea